Baja Verapaz salamander (Cryptotriton veraepacis) is a species of salamander in the family Plethodontidae.
It is endemic to Guatemala.

Its natural habitat is subtropical or tropical moist montane forests.
It is threatened by habitat loss.

References

Endemic fauna of Guatemala
Cryptotriton
Amphibians of Guatemala
Taxonomy articles created by Polbot
Amphibians described in 1978